The Pan Pacific Swimming Championships is a long course swimming event first held in 1985. It was founded as an alternative to the European Championships, for those countries that could not swim in those championships, in a manner similar to the Four Continents Figure Skating Championships which provide a similar 'continental' championships for non-European nations.

The meet was founded by its four Charter nations's swimming federations: Swimming Australia (Australia), Swimming Canada (Canada), Japan Swimming Federation (Japan), and USA Swimming (United States). As part of the Charter, hosting of the meet is to rotate among these four nations, with the meet being held in Japan every other championship. Initially, the meet was open to all countries that border the Pacific Ocean, giving the meet its name. This since has been expanded/opened to include other non-European countries wishing to participate, such as Brazil and South Africa.

The meet is considered to be one of the toughest international swimming competitions outside the Olympic Games, World Championships and European Championships, due in part to the presence of swimming power-house nationals like the United States and Australia, the first and second most medals winners, respectively.

History

The meet was initially staged biennially (every odd year), to allow for an international championship-level meet in the non-Olympic and non-World Championships years. However, beginning with the 2002 championships, due to the changing of the World Championships from every four years (even year between Olympics) to every two years (every odd year), the meet is a quadrennial event, held in the even year between Summer Olympics.

Unlike the World Championships and Olympic Games, nations can enter as many people as they like in the preliminaries of each event (in most international meets, only two swimmers from each nation are permitted). However, only two swimmers per nation can qualify for the Championships' semi-finals and finals. Prior to FINA's creation of semi-finals in the late 1990s, a total of 3 swimmers per country could qualify for the final and consolation heats of an event, with no more than 2 swimmers per country in a final or consolation.

List of championships

Note: The 1995, 1999 and 2018 editions served as the swimming test events for the Olympic venues, for the next year's Games.

Medal table (1985–2018)
All-time Pan Pacific Championships medal table (Updated after 2018 Championships)

Records

Junior Pan Pacific Swimming Championships
The Junior Pan Pacific Swimming Championships, aka Junior Pan PAC’s, is a long course swimming event that features high level 18 under swimmers around the Pacific. The event is held every other even year, and takes place in the non-world championship/junior championship years. The event was last held in 2018, with others postponed or canceled due to the global COVID-19 pandemic; future events have been postponed until after 2022.

List of championships
Junior Pan Pacific Swimming Championships:

References

 
International swimming competitions
Swimming competitions in Oceania
Recurring sporting events established in 1985
1985 establishments in Oceania